Where Love Leads is a lost 1916 silent film drama directed by Frank Griffin and starring Ormi Hawley and Rockliffe Fellowes. It was produced and distributed by Fox Film Corporation.

Cast
Ormi Hawley - Marion Barstow
Rockliffe Fellowes - Richard Warren 
Royal Byron - Fred Mason
Hayden Stevenson - Duke Canton (*as Haydn Stevenson)
Charles Craig - Sir Rankin Chatsworth
Herbert Evans - E. Faris Hawtrey
Albert Gran - Kennedy Barstow
Maud Hall Macey - Mrs. Barstow
Ilean Hume - Kathleen Chatsworth
Dorothy Rogers - Camille Dore

See also
1937 Fox vault fire

References

External links
 Where Love Leads at IMDb.com

1916 films
American silent feature films
American black-and-white films
Fox Film films
Films directed by Frank Griffin
Silent American drama films
1916 drama films
Lost American films
1916 lost films
Lost drama films
1910s American films